Rhabdodermatidae is a family of prehistoric, coelacanthimorph, lobe-finned fishes which lived during the Carboniferous period (about 359 - 299 million years ago).

References

 
Carboniferous bony fish
Prehistoric lobe-finned fish families
Carboniferous first appearances
Carboniferous extinctions